Deh-e Hajji Hoseyn (also Romanized as Deh-e Ḩājjī Ḩoseyn) is a village in Jahanabad Rural District, in the Central District of Hirmand County, Sistan and Baluchestan Province, Iran. At the 2006 census, its population was 90, in 22 families.

References 

Populated places in Hirmand County